Bossmo & Ytteren Idrettslag is a Norwegian sports club from Nord-Rana, Nordland that has sections for association football, team handball, biathlon and Nordic skiing.

The club was founded in 1908.

Its best known member is Olympic skier Elin Nilsen. The men's football team currently plays in the Fourth Division, the fifth tier of Norwegian football. They last played in the Third Division in 2008.

References

 Official site 

Football clubs in Norway
Sport in Nordland
Rana, Norway
Association football clubs established in 1908
1908 establishments in Norway